Harry Leslie Aikines-Aryeetey (pronounced Ay-yee-tey, born 29 August 1988) is an English sprinter. A prodigious junior runner, in 2005 he was named as the BBC Young Sports Personality of the Year and the IAAF's Rising Star of the Year after becoming the first athlete to win gold medals at both 100 metres and 200 metres at the World Youth Championships.

An Olympian for Great Britain at the Rio Olympics, Aikines-Aryeetey won his first senior individual medal, a bronze, in the 100 metres at the 2014 European Athletics Championships. At the same championships he earned his first senior title as part of the Great Britain team that won gold in the men's 4 x 100 metres relay. Thereafter, Aikines-Aryeetey won relay gold twice more at European level, and twice at the Commonwealth Games representing England.

Career
Aikines-Aryeetey was born in Carshalton, London to Ghanaian parents. He studied at Greenshaw High School in Sutton, London from 2000 to 2006.

His first major tournament medal came at the 2004 Commonwealth Youth Games where he won the silver medal in the 100 m.

On 11 June 2006, aged 17, he competed in the 100 m at Gateshead in which Asafa Powell equalled the world record of 9.77 s. On 16 August 2006, he won the gold in the 100 m at the 2006 World Junior Championships in Athletics, held in Beijing, China, setting a season's best 10.37 s.

He was advised not to run in 2007 due to minor fractures in the spine that could affect later development. After an eleven-month recuperation period, he returned to action in 2008 with a 60 metres personal best of 6.59 s in France to signal a return to form.

Aikines-Aryeetey was selected for Team GB at the 2009 World Championships in Athletics. As part of the men's 4 × 100 m relay team with Simeon Williamson, Tyrone Edgar and Marlon Devonish, he took bronze in Berlin with a season's best of 38.02 seconds. In 2009 Harry became a Lucozade Sport Ambassador he is also an ambassador for Mirafit.

During the 2010 IAAF World Indoor Championships, Aikines-Aryeetey had to pull out of his semi-final after qualifying third in his first-round heat due to injury. He then returned in August but was not up to full fitness and then took months to regain it for the 2011 season. In the 2011 indoor season, Aikines-Aryeetey returned to some kind of form, finishing second in the UK indoor championships and European Trials. After having qualified, he again was restrained in his heat by injury running 6.94. However, he ran a 200m personal best of 20.46 in La Chaux-de-Fonds in Switzerland in July. He went on to win the UK championships in Birmingham and qualified for the IAAF World Championships in Daegu with a time of 10.14.

Aikines-Aryeetey won his first senior individual medal in the final of the 2014 European Championships in Zurich where he finished third in a time of 10.22 seconds. In 2018 he was part of the relay team that took gold at both the commonwealth games and also the European championships, his second European gold (after Zurich 2014).

In 2020 he became British champion when winning the 100 metres event at the 2020 British Athletics Championships with a time of 10.35 sec. After sustaining an injury while running in the 2021 European Athletics Indoor Championships Harry was forced to miss the Tokyo Olympics, though 2022 has seen his track return, being selected as a member of the 4x100m squad for the 2022 World Championships, the 2022 Commonwealth Games and the 2022 European Championships.

Personal bests

References

External links

 Harry AA is back with a bang
  Atos Origin Sponsorship Page
 
 
 
 
 
 Harry Aikines-Aryeetey Mirafit Athlete Page

1988 births
Living people
People from Carshalton
Athletes from London
English male sprinters
British male sprinters
Olympic male sprinters
Olympic athletes of Great Britain
Athletes (track and field) at the 2016 Summer Olympics
Commonwealth Games silver medallists for England
Commonwealth Games gold medallists for England
Commonwealth Games medallists in athletics
Commonwealth Games gold medallists in athletics
Athletes (track and field) at the 2014 Commonwealth Games
Athletes (track and field) at the 2018 Commonwealth Games
World Athletics Championships athletes for Great Britain
World Athletics Championships medalists
European Athletics Championships winners
British Athletics Championships winners
English people of Ghanaian descent
Black British sportsmen
Ga-Adangbe people
Medallists at the 2014 Commonwealth Games
Medallists at the 2018 Commonwealth Games